Newmarket Road may be:
 Newmarket Road (football ground), former ground of Norwich City F.C. 
 Newmarket Road, Cambridge, England